Brynden George Trawick (born October 23, 1989) is a former American football safety. He played college football at Troy.

Early life
Trawick was born on October 23, 1989 in Marietta, Georgia. He attended Sprayberry High School in Marietta and was a three-year starter and two-time All-League and All-County selection. As a senior in 2007, recorded 69 tackles, an interception, two fumble recoveries and two blocked extra points. He totaled more than 600 all-purpose yards and four touchdowns, caught 15 passes for 195 yards, and rushed 17 times for 156 yards during his final high school season.

College career
After originally committing to play at Michigan State, Trawick saw limited playing time in his first two years with the Spartans. He redshirted in 2008 and recorded just two tackles in 2009.

He then transferred to Northeast Mississippi Community College in December 2009 after he was suspended from Michigan State for being present at a residence hall during an incident in which several of his teammates were charged with assault.

“My heart just wasn’t in it,” Trawick said of his time as a Spartan. “I got focused on what wasn’t important, and I needed to switch it up and get refocused again.” 

While at Troy, Trawick had 206 tackles, one sack, three interceptions, nine pass deflections, and one forced fumble.

Professional career

Baltimore Ravens
On April 27, 2013, Trawick signed with the Baltimore Ravens as an undrafted free agent.

On September 5, 2013, during the season-opener against the Denver Broncos, Trawick accidentally injured teammate Jacoby Jones when they collided on a punt Jones was attempting to catch. The collision resulted in a right knee sprain for Jones, who did not return to the game.

Oakland Raiders
Trawick signed with the Oakland Raiders on March 16, 2016. He led the Raiders with a career-best 14 special teams tackles.

Tennessee Titans
On March 10, 2017, Trawick signed a two-year, $4.75 million contract with the Tennessee Titans. On January 21, 2018, Trawick was named to his first Pro Bowl as a special teamer after posting a team-best and career-high 17 special teams tackles. In the 2018 season, he made eight combined tackles.

Baltimore Ravens (second stint)
On August 1, 2019, Trawick signed with the Baltimore Ravens. He was placed on injured reserve on October 3, 2019, with an elbow injury. He was designated for return from injured reserve on November 14, 2019, and began practicing with the team again. On December 3, 2019, Trawick was activated from injured reserve.

Personal life
Trawick’s father, George, was the head basketball coach at DeVry University in the early 1990s. He coached in the highest-scoring men’s basketball game in NCAA history, regardless of division classification. On January 12, 1992, Troy State University defeated DeVry 258–141 in a game that is considered to have established several unbreakable records.

References

External links
Tennessee Titans bio
Troy Trojans bio
Michigan State Spartans bio

1989 births
Living people
Players of American football from Marietta, Georgia
American football safeties
Michigan State Spartans football players
Troy Trojans football players
Baltimore Ravens players
Oakland Raiders players
Tennessee Titans players
American Conference Pro Bowl players